Mirosław Czech (16 December 1962, Wałcz) — Polish politician and  journalist of Ukrainian origin, the deputy of the Sejm II and III convocations. In 1987 he graduated from the Faculty of History Warsaw University. By profession a journalist, worked as an editor of the publishing house "Tyrsa" in Warsaw and in 1990-1995 — chief editor of "Zustriczi" (mean ″meetings″).

In 1993-2001 was elected II and III convocation on the list of the Democratic Union, later Freedom Union. In 1993 he was elected in Koszalin, four years later in Olsztyn (both times was selected for the nationwide list). In 2001 he tried unsuccessfully to re-election in the Olsztyn district.

Sources 
  Strona sejmowa posła III kadencji 
  Як Москва відкрила браму до пекла на Волині. І українці, і поляки були пішаками у грі великих держав // «iPress.ua» from: Mirosław Czech.
  Jak Moskwa rozpętała piekło na Wołyniu // Gazeta Wyborcza, 08.03.2013 21:14

University of Warsaw alumni
People from Wałcz
Polish people of Ukrainian descent
1968 births
Living people